Molasi is a village situated 16 km south of Tiruchengode in the Indian state of Tamil Nadu. It lies on the bank of the river Cauvery, which flows from Coorg hills.

Geography
Molasi is near to Jedarpalayam, and Patlur. The village of Solasiramani is to the east, Eryamangalam to the west and Piruthi to the north. The road from Velur to Kkumarapalayam passes through this village.

Religion
Molasi is a place of religious unity. There is a church, a temple, and a mosque in the village.

Economy
Molasi is located in a rural area.  The main occupation of people in Molasi is agriculture, but there is also some tourism.

Infrastructure
Molasi has a government school and a government hospital. The pincode is 637210.

Molasi has good roads and electricity.  It can be accessed by bus or rail.

References

External links
Map of Molasi village in Tiruchengode Taluk, Tamil Nadu in Google Maps, 706300 | villagemap.in
Molasi village in namakkal, tamil nadu

Villages in Namakkal district